Haliotis, common name abalone, is the only genus in the family Haliotidae.

This genus once contained six subgenera. These subgenera have become alternate representations of Haliotis. The genus consists of small to very large, edible, herbivorous sea snails, marine gastropod molluscs. The number of species recognized worldwide ranges between 30 and 130, with over 230 species-level taxa described. The most comprehensive treatment of the family considers 56 species valid, with 18 additional subspecies.

Other common names are ear shells, sea ears, and, rarely, muttonfish or muttonshells in parts of Australia, ormer in the UK, perlemoen in South Africa, and the Maori name for three species in New Zealand is pāua.

Description

The shells of abalones have a low, open, spiral structure, and are characterized by having several open respiratory pores in a row near the shell's outer edge. The thick inner layer of the shell is composed of nacre, which in many species of abalone is highly iridescent, giving rise to a range of strong, changeable colors, which make the shells attractive to humans as decorative objects, in jewelry, and as a source of colorful mother-of-pearl.

The shell of abalones is convex, rounded to oval shape, and may be highly arched or very flattened. The shell of the majority of species is ear-shaped, presenting a small, flat spire and two to three whorls. The last whorl, known as the body whorl, is auriform, meaning that the shell resembles an ear, giving rise to the common name "ear shell". Haliotis asinina has a somewhat different shape, as it is more elongated and distended. The shell of Haliotis cracherodii cracherodii is also unusual as it has an ovate form, is imperforate, shows an exserted spire, and has prickly ribs.

A mantle cleft in the shell impresses a groove in the shell, in which are the row of holes (known as tremata), characteristic of the genus. These holes are respiratory apertures for venting water from the gills and for releasing sperm and eggs into the water column. They make up what is known as the selenizone which forms as the shell grows. This series of eight to 38 holes is near the anterior margin. Only a small number are generally open. The older holes are gradually sealed up as the shell grows and new holes form. Therefore, the number of tremata is not characteristic for the species. Each species has a number of open holes, between four and 10, in the selenizone. This number is not fixed and can vary within a species and between populations. Abalones have no operculum. The aperture of the shell is very wide and nacreous.

The exterior of the shell is striated and dull. The color of the shell is very variable from species to species, which may reflect the animal's diet. The iridescent nacre that lines the inside of the shell varies in color from silvery white, to pink, red and green-red, to deep blue, green to purple.

The animal shows fimbriated head-lobes. The side-lobes are also fimbriated and cirrated. The rounded foot is very large. The radula has small median teeth, and the lateral teeth are single and beam-like. About 70 uncini are present, with denticulated hooks, the first four very large. The soft body is coiled around the columellar muscle, and its insertion, instead of being on the columella, is on the middle of the inner wall of the shell. The gills are symmetrical and both well developed.

These snails cling solidly with their broad muscular foot to rocky surfaces at sublittoral depths, although some species such as Haliotis cracherodii used to be common in the intertidal zone. Abalones reach maturity at a relatively small size. Their fecundity is high and increases with their size (from 10,000 to 11 million eggs at a time). The spermatozoa are filiform and pointed at one end, and the anterior end is a rounded head.

The larvae are lecithotrophic. The adults are herbivorous and feed with their rhipidoglossan radula on macroalgae, preferring red or brown algae.

By weight, about one-third of the animal is edible meat, one-third is offal, and one-third  is shell.

Structure and properties of the shell
The shell of the abalone is exceptionally strong and is made of microscopic calcium carbonate tiles stacked like bricks. Between the layers of tiles is a clingy protein substance. When the abalone shell is struck, the tiles slide instead of shattering and the protein stretches to absorb the energy of the blow. Material scientists around the world are studying this tiled structure for insight into stronger ceramic products such as body armor. The dust created by grinding and cutting abalone shell is dangerous; appropriate safeguards must be taken to protect people from inhaling these particles. There is much discussion of this topic online.

Species
The number of species that are recognized within the genus Haliotis has fluctuated over time, and depends on the source that is consulted. The number of recognized species ranges from 30 to 130. This list finds a compromise using the "WoRMS" database, plus some species that have been added, for a total of 57. The majority of abalone have not been evaluated for conservation status. Those that have been reviewed tend to show that the abalone in general is declining in numbers, and will need protection throughout the globe.

Extant species

Fossil species 

†Haliotis benoisti Cossmann, 1896 (Aquitaine, France)
†Haliotis flemingi Powell, 1938 (New Zealand)
†Haliotis lomaensis Anderson, 1902
†Haliotis mathesonensis (Eagle, 1996)
†Haliotis (Marinauris) matihetihensis (Eagle, 1999)
†Haliotis powelli C. A. Fleming, 1952
†Haliotis stalennuyi Owen & Berschauer, 2017
†Haliotis volhynica Eichwald, 1829
†Haliotis waitemataensis Powell, 1938

Conservation 
Over half of the modern Haliotis species with sufficient data are considered threatened to some extent on the IUCN Red List, with all but one species from the Pacific coast of North America being critically endangered as a consequence of massive historical overharvesting, withering abalone syndrome, and recent marine heatwaves which have caused collapses of both abalones and their habitat. Haliotis species from elsewhere are also threatened by overexploitation and climate change. In addition, abalones as a whole are considered highly vulnerable to ocean acidification due to their accretion of aragonite and dependence on susceptible coralline algae for development, and thus may eventually go extinct unless the rate of ocean acidification is arrested.

Synonyms

See also
 Abalone
 Concholepas concholepas

References

Notes

Sources
 
 
 
 
 
 
 
 
 
 
 
 
 
 
 
 
 
 
 
 

 Linnaeus, C. 1758. Systema Naturae per Regna tria Naturae, secundem Classes, Ordines, Genera, Species, cum Characteribus, Differentis, Synonymis, Locis. Tom.1 Editio decima, reformata. Holmiae : Laurentii Salvii 824 pp.
 Iredale, T. 1927. Caloundra Shells. The Australian Zoologist 4: 331-336, pl. 46
 Iredale, T. 1929. Queensland molluscan notes, No. 1. Memoirs of the Queensland Museum 9(3): 261-297, pls 30-31
 Cotton, B.C. & Godfrey, F.K. 1933. South Australian Shells. Part 9. South Australian Naturalist 15(1): 14-24
 Cotton, B.C. 1943. Australian Shells of the Family Haliotidae. Transactions of the Royal Society of South Australia 67(1): 175-180
 Moore, R.C. (ed.) 1960. Treatise on Invertebrate Paleontology. Part I. Mollusca 1. Boulder, Colorado & Lawrence, Kansas : Geological Society of America & University of Kansas Press xxiii + 351 pp.
 Wilson, B. 1993. Australian Marine Shells. Prosobranch Gastropods. Kallaroo, Western Australia : Odyssey Publishing Vol. 1 408 pp.
 Geiger, D.L. & Poppe, G.T. 2000. A Conchological Iconography. The family Haliotidae. Germany : ConchBooks 135 pp.
 Bouchet, P.; Gofas, S. (2014). Haliotis Linnaeus, 1758. Accessed through: World Register of Marine Species

External links

 
Haliotidae
Extant Late Cretaceous first appearances
Gastropod genera
Taxa named by Carl Linnaeus